Sex in Chains Blues is a song recorded by British band Radio Stars, released on their 1979 'Holiday Album' on Chiswick Records. The song, written by band member Martin Gordon, documents the exploits of so-called 'Mormon kidnapper' Joyce McKinney. The recording features notable British singer Paul Jones on harmonica and Monty Python member Graham Chapman on additional vocals (Chapman repeatedly intones the words 'hello' and 'goodbye', which Radio Stars later used an intro/outro to their live performances).

External links
 Radio Stars website
 Martin Gordon website

1979 songs